Wang Shucheng (born 18 December 1941) is a Chinese politician who served as minister of Water Resources from 1998 to 2007. He was a delegate to the 11th National People's Congress and a member of the 16th Central Committee of the Chinese Communist Party.

Biography
Wang was born in Liyang County (now Liyang), Jiangsu, on 18 December 1941. In 1959, he entered Tsinghua University, where he studied alongside Hu Jintao. 

He joined the Chinese Communist Party (CCP) in April 1965. Starting in April 1968, he successively served as deputy secretary of the CCP First Work Area Committee of the Sixth Engineering Bureau, deputy secretary of CCP Sixth Hydropower Engineering Bureau Committee, deputy secretary of the CCP Water Resources and Hydropower Construction Corporation Committee, deputy director of Hydropower Construction Bureau, and director of Water Resources and Hydropower Construction Bureau. In May 1988, he became director of Hydropower Development Department of the Ministry of Energy, a post he kept until April 1993, when he was elevated to minister of Electric Power Industry. He also served as deputy general manager of the State Power Corporation of China from January 1997 to October 1998. He was chosen as minister of Water Resources in October 1998, and served until April 2007. In March 2008, he took office as vice chairperson of the National People's Congress Financial and Economic Affairs Committee.

References

1941 births
Living people
People from Liyang
Tsinghua University alumni
Ministers of Water Resources of the People's Republic of China
People's Republic of China politicians from Jiangsu
Chinese Communist Party politicians from Jiangsu
Delegates to the 11th National People's Congress
Members of the 16th Central Committee of the Chinese Communist Party